Cai Ming may refer to:

 Cai Ming (actress) (born 1961), Chinese comedy actress
 Ming Tsai (born 1964), American celebrity chef